Choi Moo-Lim  (born 15 April 1979) is a former football goalkeeper from  South Korea.  He formerly played for Ulsan Hyundai in the K-League for 10 seasons.

External links 

1979 births
Living people
South Korean footballers
Ulsan Hyundai FC players
Gimcheon Sangmu FC players
Ulsan Hyundai Mipo Dockyard FC players
K League 1 players
Korea National League players
Association football goalkeepers